Muhammadiyah University of Yogyakarta (abbreviated as UMY) is a private university in Yogyakarta under affiliation of Muhammadiyah, the second largest Islamic organization in Indonesia.

UMY was recognized as the 4th best university and become the top private university in Indonesia by 4International Colleges and Universities (4icu) World University Rankings and Reviews in 2013  and accredited internationally by Quacquarelli Symonds (QS) Stars in 2015.

Improving the quality of HR managers receives top priority in the development of Muhammadiyah University of Yogyakarta. Therefore, every year the university sends about 20 to 30 faculty members for follow-up studies, master's and doctorate, domestically and abroad.

History

Prof. Dr. Kahar Muzakkir began throwing ideas about the need the establishment of University of Muhammadiyah. When the Central Leadership Muhammadiyah Teaching Council inaugurated the Faculty of Teacher Training and Education in Yogyakarta on November 18, 1960, its founding charter explicitly included it as part of the Guidance and Counseling, University of Muhammadiyah.

In March 1981, through the hard struggle of Muhammadiyah activists such as Drs. H. Mustafa Kamal Pasha, Drs. M. Alfian Darmawam, Hoemam Zainal, S.H., Brig. TNI. (Ret.) Drs. H. Bakri Shahid, Azhar KHAhmad Basir, MA, Ir.H.M. Dasron Hamid, M.Sc., HM Daim Saleh, Prof. Dr. H. Amien Rais, M.A., H.M.H. Mawardi, Drs. H. Hasan Basri, Drs. H. Abdul Rosyad Sholeh, Zuber Kohari, Ir. H. Basit Wahid, H Tubin Sakiman. Their persistent search for students was supported by the chairman of the UMY, KH A. R. Fakhrudin and chairman of Muhammadiyah Yogyakarta Region H. Mukhlas Abror. It formally established Muhammadiyah University of Yogyakarta, which evolved to the present.

Student life

Student organizations
 Student Executive Board (Badan Eksekutif Mahasiswa)
 Student Association (Himpunan Mahasiswa Jurusan)
 Islamic Student Association (Himpunan Mahasiswa Islam)
 Muhammadiyah University Students Association (Ikatan Mahasiswa Muhammadiyah)

Sports
 Aikido
 Badminton
 Basketball
 Futsal
 Soccer
 Taekwondo
 Tapak Suci
 Tennis
 Table Tennis
 Volleyball

Clubs
 Arabic club
 Media and Magazines
 Choir
 Cinema and Film
 Indonesian traditional dance
 Marching Band
 Model United Nations
 Mountaineering
 Modern dance
 Student Research Community
 Music
 Photography
 Student Economic Enterprise
 Student English Activity
 Theater

Faculties and schools

Faculty of Agriculture
 Department of Agribusiness
 Department of Agrotechnology

Faculty of Economics and Business
 Department of Management
 Department of Accountancy
 Department of Finance and Sharia Banking (Economics Development)

Faculty of Engineering
 Department of Civil Engineering
 Department of Electrical Engineering
 Department of Machine Engineering
 Department of Information Technology

Faculty of Islamic Studies
 Department of Communication and Islamic Counseling
 Department of Islamic Education
 Department of Finance and Sharia Banking (Muamalat)

Faculty of Language Education
 Department of Arabic Language
 Department of English Language
 Department of Japanese Language

Faculty of Law
 Department of Law
 International Program for Law and Sharia

Faculty of Medical and Health Sciences
 Department of Medicine
 Department of Dentistry
 Department of Pharmacy
 Department of Nursery

Faculty of Social and Political Science
 Department of Communication Studies
 Department of International Relations
 Jusuf Kalla School of Government

Vocational School
 Applied Accountancy
 Automotive and Manufacture Engineering
 Electromedics Engineering

International undergraduate programs
 International Program of International Relations (IPIREL)
 International Program for Islamic Economics and Finance (IPIEF)
 International Program of Governmental Studies (IGOV)
 International Program for Law and Sharia (IPOLS)
 International Program of Management and Business (IMaBs) 
 International Program of Accounting (IPAcc)
 International Program of Communication Studies (IPCos)

Partner universities

Australia
Flinders University
Griffith University

Austria
University of Applied Sciences, Upper Austria

Canada
College of New Caledonia

China
Guangxi Medical University
Guizhou University
Henan University
SIAS International University
Zhengzhou University

Bangladesh
Daffodil International University
tamirul millat kamil madrasha

Egypt
Suez Canal University

France
Université Savoie-Mont Blanc

Germany
University of Münster

India
Jagran Lakecity University

Iran
Al-Mustafa International University

Japan
University of Tokushima
Chubu Gakuin University
Ritsumeikan University
Kanazawa Institute of Technology
Kyushu University
Yamagata University

Malaysia
Universiti Sains Malaysia
Universiti Sains Islam Malaysia
Universiti Utara Malaysia
University of Malaya
International Islamic University Malaysia

Mexico
CETYS University

Morocco
University of Ibn Tofail

Netherlands
Eindhoven University of Technology

Philippines
Angeles University Foundation
Ateneo de Davao University
Cebu Technological University
Centro Escolar University
De La Salle University
Isabela State University
Mindanao State University - Iligan Institute of Technology
Philippine Normal University
The University of Mindanao
University of San Carlos

Poland
Adam Mickiewicz University in Poznań

Romania
Danubius University

Singapore
Singapore Polytechnic

South Korea
Daegu Health College
Korea University
Sun Moon University
Yonsei University
Youngsan University

Spain
Jaume I University

Taiwan
Asia University
Central Taiwan University of Science and Technology
National Cheng Kung University
National Chiayi University
National Dong Hwa University
Tamkang University
Vanung University
Yuanpei University of Medical Technology

Thailand
Chulalongkorn University
Kasetsart University
Khon Kaen University
Maejo University
Thammasat University
Suranaree University of Technology
University of the Thai Chamber of Commerce

Turkey
Istanbul University
Istanbul Medeniyet University

United Kingdom
Harper Adams University
Swansea University

United States
California Baptist University
Northern Arizona University
University of Maryland

Vietnam
Vietnam National University, Ho Chi Minh City

Notable alumni 
Fahd Pahdepie, (International Relations, 2009), Writer, entrepreneur, and philanthropist
Lalu Muhammad Iqbal, (International Relations, 1996), Indonesian diplomat. Ambassador of the Republic of Indonesia to the Republic of Turkey (2019-2021)

References

External links
University website

1981 establishments in Indonesia
Educational institutions established in 1981
Muhammadiyah University
Universities in the Special Region of Yogyakarta
Private universities and colleges in Indonesia